Trichocentrum microchilum is a species of orchid found from Mexico (Chiapas) to El Salvador.

References

External links 

microchilum
Orchids of Chiapas
Orchids of El Salvador